Wang Yaoqing (28 December 1881 – 3 June 1954) was a Chinese actor and singer noted for playing the role of a virtuous adult woman, or qingyi, the most important role in Peking opera. He was from Qingjiangpu District, Huai'an in eastern Jiangsu Province.

Wang was noted for his skills as a long-sleeved dancer, for sword dancing, and for his portrayal of a stylish Manchu lady. He was president of the National Academy of Chinese Theater Arts from 1951 to 1954. He taught many other actors, including Mei Lanfang, the best-known singer of the genre.

Biography 
Wang's father, Wang Xuanyun, was an actor in Kun Opera. He died when Yaoqing was 10. Yaoqing learned female impersonation from Tian Baolin.

In 1894, Wang performed in The Pagoda, his first play. In 1896, the Cheng Troupe was formed with Wang as a member. In 1897, he married the daughter of Yang Duoxian. His acting troupe disbanded during the Boxer Rebellion of 1900. Afterwards, he joined the Fushou Troupe.

In 1904, Wang was summoned to the palace and asked to set lyrics written by Empress Dowager Cixi to music. He was awarded thirty taels for this.

Wang registered to play for the imperial household. His role as a Manchu lady in Incident at Fen River Bend was appreciated by Cixi. He joined the Tongqing Troupe in 1905. With partner Tan Xinpei, Wang introduced various innovations to the qingyi role, including a greater range of facial expression and stylized body movement.

Wang's other notable roles include Fourth Son Visits His Mother, The Wujia Slope, Nantian Gate, Goose Gate Pass, Mulan Joins the Army, Story of a White Snake, and Story of Willow Shade.

Wang's voice deteriorated early. His last performance was in 1926 in Shanghai. In the 1930s, he was a teacher at the Chinese Opera Academy. This school was disbanded in 1941.

Wang was also a noted theater critic. He came up a set of four characters to describe the "four great dan." (A dan is a female impersonator.) Wang served as president of the National Academy of Chinese Theater Arts, which was established in 1950. He died in 1954.

More than sixty of Wang's manuscripts were left at Gumei Studio, his residence. He often collaborated with Chen Moxiang. Wang would set Chen's lyrics to music.

A sound recording series of his work aimed at schoolchildren entitled Wang Yaoqing Talks about Opera was released in 1961. In 2016, there was a concert at the Great Hall of the People in Beijing to honor Wang's 135th birthday.

Notes

References

External links 

话京剧-王瑶卿2, Peking Opera-Wang Yaoqing 2 (video)
王瑶卿先生《三堂会审》1961年珍贵说戏录音 中国唱片. Pictures and a ten minute audio of Wang.
人物：王瑶卿 (Wang Yaoqing), 梨园百年琐记 (A Hundred Years of Notes). This bio features an extensive list of notices in the contemporary Chinese media.

Further reading
Wang Yaoqing, "Wo de Youdian shidai" (My Youth), Juexue yuekan, 2.3, (1933): 17-19. Autobiographical material.
Shi Ruoxu et al, 1985, Wáng Yáoqīng yìshù pínglùn jí 王瑶卿艺术评论集 (Collected essays on the Art of Wang Yaoqing), Beijing, Zhongguo Yishu.

1881 births
1954 deaths
Chinese male Peking opera actors